1957 is the eighth studio album by the experimental band Soul-Junk. It was released on November 5, 2002 through Sounds Familyre Records.

Track listing
 Phalanx
 Non-Linear
 Jelly Wings
 Gotham
 Ungst Func Slag Collision
 Innerspacemen
 Droptop Floride
 Horse Posing As Unicorn
 Ruby Doomsday
2 Thessalonians 2
 Mercury
 Jammy July Pike
 Rap City Ark
 Uqbar Orbis
 Vesuvius

Credits
Glen Galaxy
Slo-Ro
Tracking: Tim Coffman
Overbuddy: Ero Thompson
Mastering: Rafter Roberts
"Girl Singer:" O.B.M.
Artwork: Paul Goode

References

2002 albums
Soul-Junk albums
Sounds Are Active albums